A Bit of Tom Jones? is a 2009 Welsh comedy film written, produced and directed by Peter Watkins-Hughes. It was shot on location in Tredegar, Wales, and filmed in the summer of 2007. It was independently financed by community businesses in South Wales Valleys.

Cast
Jonny Owen 
Roger Evans (actor)
Eve Myles 
Matt Berry 
John Henshaw
Denise Welch 
Margaret John 
Geno Washington 
Neil Rayment 
Stephen Marzella

Reception
In November 2009, the film received a theatrical run at the Vue cinema chain in Wales. So successful was this run, that Vue hosted a Leicester Square red carpet screening in London. It was released on DVD in April 2010. 
In May 2010 A Bit Of Tom Jones? won the Best Film award at the BAFTA Cymru event held at the Wales Millennium Centre in Cardiff.

References

External links
 

2009 films
English-language Welsh films
2009 comedy films
British comedy films
Welsh films
2000s English-language films
2000s British films